A spaza shop, also known as a tuck shop, is an informal convenience shop business in South Africa, usually run from home. They also serve the purpose of supplementing household incomes of the owners, selling small everyday household items. These shops grew as a result of sprawling townships that made travel to formal shopping places more difficult or expensive. In recent times, Somalis in South Africa are noted for running spaza shops in black townships.

South African banks are trying to win spaza shops as "bank shops" offering minimal banking services at lower costs than full bank branch offices. The link to the bank's back office is mostly via mobile phone based mobile banking.

References

External links

Business in South Africa